Moritz Stoppelkamp (born 11 December 1986) is a German footballer who plays as a midfielder for MSV Duisburg.

Club career
Stoppelkamp played for Rot-Weiss Essen from July 2005 to August 2006. He made 15 appearances during the 2005–06 season. He was loaned to Rot-Weiß Erfurt for the 2006–07 season. During the 2006–07 season, he made 21 appearances for the first team and scored a goal in four appearances for the reserve team. Stoppelkamp returned to Rot-Weiss Essen for the 2007–08 season. During the 2007–08 season, Stoppelkamp scored two goals in 11 appearances.

Stoppelkamp made his debut on the professional league level in the 2. Bundesliga for Rot-Weiß Oberhausen on 17 August 2008, when he started in a game against TuS Koblenz. He finished the 2008–09 season with 16 appearances. During the 2009–10 season, he scored nine goals in 33 appearances.

He joined Hannover 96 for the following two season. During the 2010–11 season, Stoppelkamp made 24 appearances. During the 2011–12 season, he made 28 appearances.

He joined 1860 Munich for the 2012–13 and 2013–14 seasons. During the 2012–13 season, he scored nine goals in 36 appearances. During the 2013–14 season, he scored seven goals in 36 appearances.

Joining SC Paderborn he was a regular starter for the team on the right side of the midfield. On 20 September 2014, Stoppelkamp scored a goal from 83 metres in a 2–0 victory against former club Hannover, a record in Bundesliga history. He finished the 2014–15 season with four goals in 28 appearances. During the 2015–16 season, he scored six goals in 31 appearances.

During the 2016–17 season, Stoppelkamp played for Karlsruher SC, where he scored four goals in 24 appearances.

On 3 July 2017, he returned to his youth club MSV Duisburg signing a two-year contract including the option for a third. He finished his first season with nine goals in 33 appearances. He extended his contract on 11 June 2019. A new one-year deal was signed in May 2022, keeping him at the club until 2023.

International career
Stoppelkamp represented the Germany U20 national team four times.

Career statistics

References

External links

1986 births
Living people
Footballers from Duisburg
Association football midfielders
German footballers
Germany youth international footballers
Bundesliga players
2. Bundesliga players
Regionalliga players
Oberliga (football) players
Rot-Weiss Essen players
FC Rot-Weiß Erfurt players
Rot-Weiß Oberhausen players
Hannover 96 players
TSV 1860 Munich players
SC Paderborn 07 players
Karlsruher SC players
MSV Duisburg players
3. Liga players